The Free City of Haven is a supplement published by Gamelords in 1981 for the fantasy role-playing game Thieves' Guild.

Contents
The Free City of Haven is the first of three fantasy game modules describing a city of 80,000. The supplement includes twenty-five scenarios and random street encounters, as well as detailed information on businesses and important people in the city. Eleven maps of various neighborhoods are also included.

The supplement was re-issued as a boxed set re-titled Haven: The Free City in 1984.

Reception
In the November 1981 edition of The Space Gamer (No. 45), Lewis Pulsipher commented that "I can't decide for you whether this is what you need. But it's a damn good job."

In the June 1982 edition of Dragon (#62), Arlen Walker was excited by the breadth of information provided, saying, "Moreso than any city I’ve ever played in, Haven is alive. Its inhabitants are not mere NPC’s, but real people, with lives, plans, and secrets of their own. Its business establishments are completely detailed, from hours of operation to regular customers, from the personality of the owner to where he keeps his cashbox." However, Walker did have a problem with where all of this information was found. "The statistics are all bunched in an appendix, with no clues therein as to where the detailed descriptions for each character are located in the main text." Walker also had a problem with the maps, or rather the lack of them, pointing out that the box promises "a complete package"; but upon opening the box, he discovered that the eleven included maps only covered about a third of the city, and that buyers would have to wait for two more future products from Gamelords to get the other maps. "If Gamelords intended to produce two more volumes of Haven when this one was written, why didn’t the company inform prospective buyers of that?" Looking beyond these objections, Walker concluded with a recommendation, saying, "The Free City of Haven is indeed 'the best'".

In the June–July 1982 edition of White Dwarf (Issue #31), Lew Pulsipher noted that although there was a lot of material included, "there are few maps of individual buildings, and many buildings are unaccounted for, not surprising in a city this size." Pulsipher believed this was a supplement that would appeal to players interested in role-playing rather than combat, saying, "The place is designed for hard-core role-players, fans of improvisational theatre who enjoy a long chat with an NPC as much as they enjoy a fight", and he warned that for that reason, "the referee should be experienced and patient." Pulsipher gave the supplement an above average rating of 9 out of 10.

In the March–April 1985 edition of Space Gamer (No. 73), Rick Swan reviewed the 1984 boxed set, and commented that "It's an excellent design, and the enthusiasm the designers brought to the project is evident throughout. If the characters occasionally lapse into stereotypes and if the scenarios occasionally seem overly familiar . . . given the size and scope of Haven, such flaws are easy to forgive."

In a retrospective review of The Free City of Haven in Black Gate, John ONeill said "once you got past the cheap packaging, The Free City of Haven delivers all kinds of wonders. The zip-lock bag came with a huge, fold-out color map of the city, sectioned off into boroughs with names like the Outlands, Commons, and North Corridor — and a dangerous nest of curving streets in the slums called the Labyrinth."

Reviews
Different Worlds #20 (March, 1982)

References

External links
Review in Games International

Role-playing game supplements introduced in 1981
Thieves' Guild (role-playing game) supplements